Carex aphyllopus is a species of sedge. Its native range is Central Japan.

Infraspecies 
Carex aphyllopus var. aphyllopus
Carex aphyllopus var. impura (Ohwi) T.Koyama

References 

aphyllopus
Flora of Japan
Plants described in 1904
Taxa named by Georg Kükenthal